Kazuo Sato may refer to:

, Japanese cross-country skier
, Japanese weightlifter